Saratov Conservatory is a music conservatory in Russia.

The conservatory in Saratov, was founded in 1912, and was the first provincial conservatory to be founded in Russia, after St Petersburg Conservatory and Moscow Conservatory. Saratov was, at the time, Russia's third city. The main building of the conservatory had been built in 1902 by architect Alexander Yulyevich Yagn, and originally it housed a music school. Before the opening of the conservatory in 1912, the building was reconstructed by the architect Semyon Akimovich Kallistratov. When Saratov Conservatory opened in September 1912, it immediately had 1,000 students ready to begin their studies.

In 1935 the Conservatory was named after the tenor Leonid Sobinov.

Former Directors 

 Stanislav Kasparovich Echsner (Exner, Eksner) (19121914)
 Josef Ivanovich Slivinskii,  (19141916)
 George Edvardovich Konyus,  (19171919)
 Emil Hájek,  (19201921)

Notable teachers
 Karl Wilhelm (Vasily Georgievich) Brandt, (trumpeter)
 Ivan Lipaev (trombone and music history)
 Mikhail E. Medvedev, (singing)
 Viktor Ivanovich Egorov, Honored Artist of Russia
 Natalia Kimovna Tarasova, Honored Artist of Russia
 Józef Śliwiński
 Roman Moiseyev
 Konstanty Gorski
 Mikhail Bukinik
 Tatiana Stepanova - ballet
 Arnold Azrikan
 Nisson Shkarovsky

Alumni
 Alyona Apina, lead vocalist of Kombinaciya
 Fatma Mukhtarova
 Lidia Ruslanova
 Anna Yevdokimova (pen name Anna t'Haron) — a Russian pianist, Artist, grant holder of the “Prins Bernhard Cultuurfonds” (Netherlands).
 Franciszek Zachara, graduated 1919

Exchange programme schools
 Royal Carillon School "Jef Denyn"

Saratov Symphony Orchestra
Saratov Conservatory has an associated orchestra, the Saratov Conservatory Symphony Orchestra founded in 1912, which traditionally shares its chief conductor with the Saratov Philharmonic Orchestra.

See also
 List of institutions of higher learning in Russia
 Russian Academy of Theatre Arts

References

Saratov Conservatory
Objects of cultural heritage of Russia of federal significance
Cultural heritage monuments in Saratov Oblast
Music schools in Russia